Heliomata cycladata, the common spring moth, is a moth of the  family Geometridae. The species was first described by Augustus Radcliffe Grote and Coleman Townsend Robinson in 1866. It is found in eastern North America, with records from southern Ontario, southern Quebec, Maine, New Hampshire, Michigan, Wisconsin to South Carolina, Georgia, Alabama, northern Mississippi and Arkansas.

The wingspan is about 20 mm. Adults are on wing from March to July.

The larvae feed on Robinia pseudoacacia and Gleditsia triacanthos.

References

External links 
 
 

Macariini
Moths described in 1866
Moths of North America